Vailima may refer to:
Vailima, Samoa is a village in Samoa, notable as the last residence of Robert Louis Stevenson
Vailima (spider) is a genus of jumping spiders
Vailima (beer) is a beer brewed in Samoa by Samoa Breweries Limited
Vailima Orchard is an apple farm in Richmond, New Zealand